Erick Lawrence Swenson (born Phoenixville, Pennsylvania, 1972) is an American figurative sculptor living and working in Dallas, Texas.

Education
He earned a B.F.A. in Studio Art, Painting and Drawing, from the School of Visual Arts, University of North Texas, in 1999.

Exhibitions

Swenson has shown internationally at galleries and museums such as the Hammer Museum in Los Angeles, the Villa Stuck in Munich, and was included in the 2004 Biennial Exhibition of the Whitney Museum of American Art in New York. He held an exhibition  in 2012 at the Nasher Sculpture Center, Dallas, running from April 14, the first solo exhibition there by a Dallas artist.

Swenson is known for his urethane resin recreations of creatures in death or distress.  I Am What I Isn't, from 2017, is an example of the artist's finely detailed sculptures made entirely from cast urethane resin and acrylic paint.  Some of his creatures are displayed in elaborate dioramas.  Swenson's scenes often involve fabricated animals like deer, sheep, and apes captured frozen in allegorical moments. Inspired by museum exhibits and model making, Swenson's tableaux conjure the Romanticism of Caspar David Friedrich and the imagery of wintry Bavarian fairy tales.

Swenson is represented by the James Cohan Gallery in New York.

Public Collections
 The Dallas Museum of Art, Dallas, Texas
 Honolulu Museum of Art, Honolulu, Hawaii
 Nasher Sculpture Center, Dallas, Texas
 Maramotti Collection, Reggio Emilia, Italy
 Modern Art Museum of Ft. Worth, Texas
 Museum of Fine Arts, Houston, Texas
 The Saatchi Collection, London
 Sheldon Memorial Art Gallery, University of Nebraska
 Whitney Museum of American Art, New York

Awards

1999 The Arch and Anne Giles Kimbrough Fund, The Dallas Museum of Art, Dallas, TX
2004 The Joan Mitchell Painters and Sculptors Grant Program Award, The Joan Mitchell Foundation

References
 Honolulu Museum of Art, Abstruction: The Sculpture of Erick Swenson, Honolulu Museum of Art, 2018, 
 Kent, Rachel, Swallow Swenson: An Exhibition of Sculptural Works by Ricky Swallow and Erick Swenson, Museum of Contemporary Art, Sydney, Australia, 2001

Footnotes

20th-century American sculptors
1972 births
Living people
People from Phoenixville, Pennsylvania
21st-century American sculptors
Sculptors from Pennsylvania